Valerie Cooney Sings is an Australian television series of which little information is available. Broadcast on Sydney station ABN-2 from 8 February 1958 to 15 March 1958, TV listings suggest the series featured Valerie Cooney and the Jack Allan Trio. It was a 15-minute series aired on Saturdays.

Cooney had previously hosted Picture Page and later in 1958 appeared in TCN-9's series The House and Garden Show.

The series followed Saturday Screenplay on the schedule, which consisted of feature-length films.

Valerie Cooney Sings was replaced on the schedule by Vic Sabrino Sings.

References

External links

American live television series
1958 Australian television series debuts
1958 Australian television series endings
Australian Broadcasting Corporation original programming
Black-and-white Australian television shows
English-language television shows
Australian music television series